Cycle sport  is competitive physical activity using bicycles. There are several categories of bicycle racing including road bicycle racing, cyclo-cross, mountain bike racing, track cycling, BMX,  and cycle speedway. Non-racing cycling sports include artistic cycling, cycle polo, freestyle BMX and mountain bike trials. The  (UCI) is the world governing body for cycling and international competitive cycling events. The International Human Powered Vehicle Association is the governing body for human-powered vehicles that imposes far fewer restrictions on their design than does the UCI. The UltraMarathon Cycling Association is the governing body for many ultra-distance cycling races.

Bicycle racing is recognised as an Olympic sport. Bicycle races are popular all over the world, especially in Europe. The countries most devoted to bicycle racing include Belgium, Denmark, France, Germany, Italy, the Netherlands, Spain and Switzerland. Other countries with international standing include Australia, Luxembourg, United Kingdom, United States and Colombia.

History

The first bicycle race is popularly held to have been a  race on the 31 May 1868 at the Parc de , Paris, France.  It was won by expatriate Englishman James Moore who rode a wooden bicycle with solid rubber tires. The machine is now on display at the museum in Ely, Cambridgeshire, England.

The  was founded on 14 April 1900 by Belgium, the United States, France, Italy, and Switzerland to replace the International Cycling Association, which had been formed in 1892, over a row with Great Britain as well as because of other issues.

Since the rise of the Olympic Movement at the 1896 Summer Olympics, cycling has been a contestant event in every Summer Olympic Games.

Racing

Road bicycle

Road bicycle racing involve both team and individual competition, and races are contested in various ways.

The races typically take place from spring through to autumn. Many riders from the Northern Hemisphere spend the winter in countries such as Australia to compete or train. Criteriums are races based on circuits typically less than a mile in length and sometimes run for a set time (60 min, 90 min, etc.) rather than a specific distance. Criteriums are the most popular form of road racing in North America. As well as road races in which all riders start simultaneously, individual time trial and team time trial events are also held on road-based courses.

Track cycling

Track cycling has been around since as early as 1870. The riders competed on wooden indoor tracks that closely resembled the modern velodromes of today. Unlike road racing, which is dependent on environmental factors, indoor tracks ensure the sport can be competed all year round.

It encompasses races that take place on banked tracks or velodromes. Events are quite diverse and can range from individual and team pursuits, two-man sprints, to various group and mass start races. Competitors use track bicycles which do not have brakes or freewheels.

Cyclo-cross

Cyclo-cross originated as a sport for road racers during the off season, to vary their training during the cold months.  Races typically take place in the autumn and winter (the international or World Cup season is September–January) and consist of many laps of a  course featuring pavement, wooded trails, grass, steep hills, and obstacles requiring the rider to dismount, carry the bike and remount in one motion. Races for senior categories are generally between 30 minutes and an hour long, the distance varying depending on the conditions. The sport is strongest in traditional road cycling countries such as Belgium (Flanders in particular) and France.

Mountain bike

Mountain bike races are held off-road and involve moderate to high degree of technical riding. There are several varieties; the main categories are cross-country, enduro and downhill but also 4X or four-cross racing.

BMX

BMX takes place off-road. BMX races are sprints on purpose-built off-road single-lap tracks, typically on single-gear bicycles. Riders navigate a dirt course of jumps and banked and flat corners.

Cycle speedway

Cycle speedway is bicycle racing on short outdoor dirt tracks,  in length.

Motor-paced racing

Motor-paced racing and keirin use motorcycles for pacing, so cyclists achieve higher speeds.

Gravel racing

Gravel racing is one of the newest disciplines of bicycle racing, emerging in the 21st century. For example, one of the premiere gravel races, Unbound Gravel, started in 2006. Some precursors to gravel racing in its current form include road races like the Tour of the Battenkill and Boulder–Roubaix (named after Paris–Roubaix) which are road races with gravel sections. The distinguishing features of gravel racing include long distances, often , and mass starts that include all categories of racers, similar to Gran Fondo rides. The bicycles and courses in gravel racing vary widely, from road bicycles with wide tires used on smooth gravel roads to bicycles that are similar to mountain bike used on courses that include technical trails.

Average speeds
Speeds achieved on indoor tracks are usually greater than those on roads. Other factors affecting speed are the route profile (flats and hills), wind conditions, temperatures and elevation. The top average speed over the men's  time trial at the 2004 Summer Olympics was  recorded by Chris Hoy.

Mountain bike trials
Mountain bike trials is a sport where riders navigate natural and human-made obstacles without putting down their foot, or "dabbing".  It is similar to motorcycle trials. Points are awarded for bike handling skills. The first UCI Trials World Championships took place in 1986.

Non-racing disciplines

Freestyle BMX
Freestyle BMX is an extreme sport of stunt riding BMX bikes.

Artistic cycling
Artistic cycling is a discipline where athletes perform tricks (called exercises) in a format similar to ballet or gymnastics.

See also

References

External links

 cycling shoes
 Cycling on International Paralympic Committee website

 
Summer Olympic sports
Athletic sports